Distance is the fourth album by Dan Michaelson aka Dan Michaelson and The Coastguards. Released by London label The state51 Conspiracy in August 2014.

A video, directed by Edward Mantle, was created for the second single, Bones.

Track listing

References

2014 albums